Cavtat is a town in the Dubrovnik-Neretva County of Croatia.

History

Antiquity

The original city was founded by the Greeks in the 6th century BC under the name of Epidaurus (or Epidauros). The surrounding area was inhabited by the Illyrians, who called the city Zaptal.

The town changed its name to Epidaurum when it came under Roman rule in 228 BC. Justinian I the Emperor of the Byzantine Empire sent his fleet to Cavtat during the Gothic War (535–554) and occupied the town.

The city was sacked and destroyed by the Avars and Slavs in the 7th century. Refugees from Epidaurum fled to the nearby island, Laus (Ragusa) which over time evolved into the city of Dubrovnik.

Middle Ages
The town was re-established in the Middle Ages. After a short while it came under the control of its powerful neighbor, the Republic of Ragusa.

The modern Croatian name for the city reveals its ancient origins and its link with Dubrovnik.

Economy

Today, Cavtat is a popular tourist destination with many hotels and private households that rent rooms and apartments. The seafront is filled with shops and restaurants. There are several beaches in Cavtat and its surroundings, among them Pasjača, as well as Ključice, Obod, Rat and Žal. A ferry boat connects the town to neighbouring Mlini and Dubrovnik. There are often many private luxury ships and yachts along the strand.

Culture

The town cemetery on the hill contains a mausoleum belonging to the Račić family and decorated by the sculptor Ivan Meštrović.

In year 2004 Cavtat got the title European Competition for Towns and Villages in Blooms, especially for the well-tended green areas and flower arrangements on the beach promenade.

The Epidaurus Festival of Music has been held annually in Cavtat since 2007.

Notable people 

 Vlaho Bukovac (1855–1922), painter
 Tino Pattiera (1890–1966), opera singer
 Luko Zore (1846–1906), philologist and Slavist
 Frano Supilo (1870–1917), politician
 Baltazar Bogišić (1834–1908), jurist, law historian and ethnologist
 Niko Koprivica (1889–1944), politician
 Dinko Zlatarić (1558–1613), poet and translator
 Raimondo Cunich (1719–1794), humanist
 Ljudevit Vuličević (1839–1916), Serbian writer and patriot

International relations

Twin towns — Sister cities

Cavtat is twinned with:
  Bochnia, Poland
  Watsonville, California, USA

See also 
 Croatia
 Dubrovnik
 Dalmatia
 Republic of Ragusa
 Epidaurus

Gallery

References
Notes

External links 

 Cavtat Info, Villa Vidak: Cavtat Information
 Cavtatportal.com, Up to date news from Cavtat and vicinity

Populated places in Dubrovnik-Neretva County
Populated coastal places in Croatia
6th-century BC establishments
Populated places established in the 6th century BC
Konavle